GNP, or gross national product, now known as gross national income, is a measure of national income and output.

GNP may also refer to:

Government and politics 
 Gibraltar National Party, a political party in Gibraltar
 Grand National Party, a political party in South Korea
 Greater Nottingham Partnership, a local government alliance in England
 Grenada National Party, a political party in Grenada

Music 
 GNP Crescendo Records, an American record label
 GNP Records, an American jazz record label

Other uses 
 Gender neutral pronoun
 Global network positioning
 Gold nanoparticle
 Green national product

See also 
 Global Network of People living with HIV/AIDS, also known as GNP+